The Secret Place is a 1957 British crime film that was the directorial debut of Clive Donner. It stars Belinda Lee, Ronald Lewis, and David McCallum in a supporting role.

Plot
In this crime melodrama, set in a badly bombed district in the East End of London after the war, a gang carries out a diamond robbery and an adolescent boy, Freddie Haywood, discovers their loot hidden in his home.

Freddie has a crush on a kiosk attendant, Molly Wilson, who is engaged to Gerry Carter, a member of the gang. After the robbery, from a jeweller's in Hatton Garden, Gerry hides the diamonds inside Molly's record player. Not knowing this, Molly gives the player to Freddie as a thankyou gift. Freddie discovers the diamonds and the gang go after him.

Cast
 Belinda Lee as Molly Wilson
 Ronald Lewis as Gerry Carter
 Michael Brooke as Freddie Haywood
 Michael Gwynn as Steve Warring
 Geoffrey Keen as Mr Haywood
 David McCallum as Mike Wilson 
 Maureen Pryor as Mrs Haywood 
 George Selway as Paddy 
 George A. Cooper as Harry

Production
Clive Donner had been an editor on Genevieve, I am a Camera and other films. This was his first film as director.

Filming took place at Pinewood Studios, starting in June 1956.

Anthony Steel was meant to play the male lead but he broke his contract with Rank and was replaced by Ronald Lewis.  The film also gave David McCallum his breakthrough role.

Clive Donner said it was "quite clear" the Rank Organisation wanted him to cast Belinda Lee. He went to see her play Rosalind in As You Like It on stage but felt she was not "convincingly working class" which the role required. He wanted to cast Barbara Archer and screen tested her, but John Davis did not want to cast her as "he was determined to have Belinda". So Donner cast Lee and said she worked very hard. Donner says Davis also disliked the locations feeling they were too ugly; however the director was supported by Rank executive James Archibald. Donner tried to cast lesser known faces and got many from theatre workshops. "They were absolutely right, absolutely natural," he said.

Reception
Donner said the film "did alright" when it came out although its release coincided with the Suez Crisis.

Variety said "the East End setting among London’s bombed sites provides an intriguing background for this crime meller. But the story unspools too casually, dissipating too much of the potential tension.. As it stands, it's a modest b.o. bet. moderately entertaining."

Lindsay Anderson, writing in the New Statesman called the opening sequence "the most exciting sequence seen on a (wide) screen in this country in the last five years" and said the film was "a remarkably assured and craftsmanlike start" for Donner's career.

The Monthly Film Bulletin said the film "gains strongly over the average British crime thriller in its concern to establish a realistic background and setting. The East End locations are well chosen and freshly observed; the characters (apart from the two criminals, who seem rather unduly public school) quite convincingly inhabit this world of grey back streets and derelict bomb-sites. The balance between action sequences (the neatly-staged robbery and the final chase) and character study is well sustained, and Belinda Lee gives her best performance to date."

The British Film Institute praised the "remarkable debut screenplay by Linette Perry, which manages to intertwine the generic conventions of the heist thriller with a simple, but poetic, moral drama. In Perry's world the secret places stretch beyond the physical – the record player, gang hideouts and derelict buildings – into the hearts of the young protagonists. Faced with opportunity and misguided by love, the characters are all confronted with their own buried selfishness."

Filmink called it a "minor classic" and claimed that it the one film in Belinda Lee's career that comes close to cult status.

References

External links

The Secret Place at BFI Screenonline

1957 films
Films directed by Clive Donner
Films scored by Clifton Parker
Films shot at Pinewood Studios
1950s English-language films
British crime drama films
1957 crime drama films
Films set in London
1957 directorial debut films
1950s British films